Diadenylate cyclase , DNA integrity scanning protein DisA is a DNA binding protein participates in a DNA-damage check-point. DisA forms globular foci that rapidly scan along the chromosomes searching for lesions. Catalytic activity

 2 ATP  2 diphosphate + cyclic di-3',5'-adenylate.

This enzyme has diadenylate cyclase activity, catalyzing the condensation of 2 ATP molecules into cyclic di-AMP (c-di-AMP). c-di-AMP likely acts as a signaling molecule that may couple DNA integrity with a cellular process. This rate-limiting step is the accessibility of the active site; mutating the possible exit tunnel (residues 128-130) increases product 2-fold despite Arg-130 being important for ATP-binding. Does not convert GTP to c-di-GMP.

References 

EC 2.7.7
Bacterial proteins